Nambidi is a caste of Kerala, India. The form a part of the Brahmin community.  They are considered to be  Malayali Brahmins and to have originated when a section of the Nambudiris was degraded. 
They also have the same rights and rituals of nambudiri's. The nambidi ladies are usually called Mandals / Atholammas used to wear the cheruthalis and are similar to Antharjanams (Namboothiri Ladies). The nambidi's also had great economic and Societic importance and have the same grade of Nambudiris in the Society. They have no right to do Poojas in temples.
Nambidis are divided into two: the ones who wear the sacred thread and perform the Upanayanam and the ones who do not. The former are Nambudiris who were degraded to the Brahmins status since their ancestors had committed a heinous act by murdering a ruler of Kerala. On their return the other Nambudiris welcomed them but they refused to seat themselves with the other Brahmins owing to the sin they committed and instead sat on the steps of the hall. They came to be known as Nom Padimels or those on the steps and this term was later corrupted into Nambidi. The latter are Nairs who were assigned the Nambidi title. Namboodiris will Join with nambidi's in all their functions and rituals.

See also
 Ambalavasi
 Pushpaka Brahmin
 Nambiar (Ambalavasi caste)

References

Nair
Malayali Brahmins
Social groups of Kerala
Hindu communities